David R. Herndon (born 1953) is a former United States district judge of the United States District Court for the Southern District of Illinois.

Education and career
Born in Sedalia, Missouri, Herndon received a Bachelor of Arts degree from Southern Illinois University Edwardsville in 1974 and a Juris Doctor from Southern Illinois University School of Law in 1977. He was in private practice from 1977 to 1991, and was an Associate Judge of the Third Judicial Circuit Court of the State of Illinois from 1991 to 1998.

Federal judicial service
On April 23, 1998, Herndon was nominated by President Bill Clinton to a seat on the United States District Court for the Southern District of Illinois vacated by Judge William L. Beatty. Herndon was confirmed by the United States Senate on October 21, 1998, and received his commission on October 22, 1998. He served as Chief Judge of the district from 2007 to 2014. He announced his retirement from service, effective January 7, 2019. He retired from active service on January 7, 2019.

References

Sources

1953 births
Living people
Illinois state court judges
Judges of the United States District Court for the Southern District of Illinois
United States district court judges appointed by Bill Clinton
Southern Illinois University Edwardsville alumni
People from Sedalia, Missouri
Southern Illinois University School of Law alumni
Date of birth missing (living people)
20th-century American judges
21st-century American judges